Cape Bernard is a cape on the island of Réunion.  It is in the commune of Saint-Denis, along the northern coast of the island near the area of La Montagne.  The route du Littoral crosses over the cape.

References 

Headlands of Réunion
Saint-Denis, Réunion